This is a list of diplomatic missions in Sierra Leone.  At present, the capital city of Freetown hosts 17 embassies/high commissions.

Embassies/High Commissions in Freetown

Other missions in Freetown
 (Delegation)

Non-resident embassies/high commissions

Resident in Abidjan, Ivory Coast

 

 

Resident in Abuja, Nigeria

Resident in Accra, Ghana

Resident in Conakry, Guinea

 

 

Resident in Dakar, Senegal

 

 

Resident elsewhere

 (London)
 (London)
 (Monrovia）
 (Tripoli)
 (Addis Ababa)
 (London)
 (Valletta)
 (Rabat)
 (London)
 (London)
 (Stockholm)

References
Freetown Diplomatic List

Foreign relations of Sierra Leone
Diplomatic missions
Sierra Leone